Mrugam is a 1996 Telugu crime film, written and directed by Rudraraju Suresh Varma. Actor J. D. Chakravarthy played the role of a sincere cop in the film

Plot
The plot revolves around a politician criminal nexus and love drama.

Cast

Soundtrack 

The soundtrack was composed by Raj and all lyrics were written by Sirivennela Seetharama Sastry.

References

External links
https://web.archive.org/web/20110806034139/http://www.jointscene.com/artists/Kollywood/Maheswari/9930

1996 films
1990s Telugu-language films